Pope Cosmas III of Alexandria was the Coptic Pope of Alexandria and Patriarch of the See of St. Mark.

According to the History of the Patriarchs of Alexandria, after Abuna Peter of the Ethiopian Orthodox Church had become embroiled in a civil war and was forced into exile, and the Emperor of Ethiopia requested a new Abuna to replace him, Cosmas III refused to ordain a new Abuna because Peter was still alive. This led to strained relations between the two powers.

10th-century Coptic Orthodox popes of Alexandria